The Fiji women's national under-18 basketball team is a national basketball team of Fiji, administered by the Fiji Amateur Basketball Federation.

It represents the country in international under-18 (under age 18) women's basketball competitions.

See also
Fiji women's national basketball team
Fiji men's national under-18 basketball team

References

External links
Fiji Basketball Records at FIBA Archive

Fiji women's national basketball team
Women's national under-18 basketball teams